Carnwath railway station was located just west of the village of Carnwath, on the Caledonian Railway line between Carstairs railway station and Edinburgh.

It was closed by in 1966 concurrently with the stations to the north Auchengray, Cobbinshaw, and Harburn.

References

Disused railway stations in South Lanarkshire
Beeching closures in Scotland
Railway stations in Great Britain opened in 1848
Railway stations in Great Britain closed in 1966
Former Caledonian Railway stations
1848 establishments in Scotland
1966 disestablishments in Scotland